Glenn Daniels (born 30 January 1994 in Belgium) is a Belgian footballer who is last known to have played for Lommel S.K. in his home country.

Career

Daniels started his senior career with Birmingham City. In 2012, he signed for Partick Thistle in the Scottish Championship, where he made one appearance and scored zero goals. After that, he played for Dutch club Fortuna Sittard and Belgian clubs Sporting Hasselt and Lommel S.K. before retiring.

References

External links 
 Jags' Daniels looks to be monarch of the SFL Glenn 
 Glenn's content with waiting game 
 I've Learned from Best 2 in the World 
 Glenn Daniëls (ex-Birmingham en Celtic): ‘Opleidingsvergoeding was molensteen rond mijn hals’ (full article)
 Glenn Daniëls (ex-Birmingham en Celtic): ‘Opleidingsvergoeding was molensteen rond mijn hals’ 
 Het Nieuwsblad Tag 
 Glenn Daniels on trial at Genk 
 at Soccerway 
 Fortuna Supporters collectief Profile

1994 births
Living people
Belgian footballers
Belgian expatriate footballers
Expatriate footballers in Scotland
Expatriate footballers in the Netherlands
Partick Thistle F.C. players
Association football goalkeepers